FreeNetWorld is a film festival held annually in Niš, Niš Fortress, Serbia.

Awards

2012
 The best experimental film of the FNW fest 2012: HAIR – Joao Seica (UK)
 The best animated film of the FNW fest 2012: Howl – Natalie Bettelheim & Sharon Michaeli (ISRAEL)
 The best documentary film of the FNW fest 2012: Bremec – Svetlana Dramlic (SLOVENIA)
 The best fiction film of the FNW fest 2012: 4”13 to KATOWIC – Andrzej Stopa (POLAND)
 The Film of the Festival - FNW Award: Ludzie Normalni - Piotr Zlotorowicz (POLAND)

2011
 FNW Audience award is Dulce by Iván Ruiz Flores.    
 The best FNW documentary film is: Machine man by Roser Corella and Alfonso Moral    
 The best FNW fiction film is: The Piano by Levon Minasian    
 The best FNW animation film is: Amar by Isabel Herguera    
 The best experimental film is: Das Heimweh der Feldforscher by Markus Kaatsch    
 The best FNW film is: Porque hay cosas que nunca se olvidan by Lucas M. Figueroa

2010
 Special jury award: Ahate pasa - Koldo Almandoz, Spain
 The best fiction: – Fabian Giessler, Germany
 The best experimental film: Goodbye Mrs. Ant– Rick Niebe, Italy
 The best documentary film: Dirty Martini - Iban del Campo, Spain
 The best animated film: The Piece - Goran Radovanovanovic, Serbia
 The best FNW film award: ONA- Pau Camarasa, Spain
 Audience award: 5 recuerdos (fiction)- Oriana Alcaine Alejandra Márquez, Spain

2009
 The best documentary film: Asamara - Jon Garaño and Raul Lopez, Spain
 The best animated film: Solitude - Mehrdad Sheikhan, Iran
 The best fiction: So deep in your room - Jacob Mendel, USA
 The best music video: After lie - Velibor Stanojevic and Miodrag Ignjatovic, Serbia
 The most technically innovative film award: The tale of little puppetboy - Johannes Nyholm, Sweden
 The best FNW film award: Asamara - Jon Garaño and Raul Lopez, Spain
 Audience award: Maiden's well (Serbian: Devojački bunar) - Marko Backovic, Serbia

2008
Open Movie Award:
David Jakubovic - Joined at the Head, USA

See also
List of film festivals in Europe

References

External links
 Official website

Film festivals in Serbia